Billy "Uke" Carpenter is believed to be a stage name of William "Billy" Costello, who was best known as the original voice of Popeye.

Carpenter was a ukulele player of note during the 1920s, known for his performances in the "eefin" style, which was also practiced by Cliff Edwards.  "Uke" had been paired musically with Aileen Stanley and with Gene Austin and had several recordings released under such pseudonyms as "Red Pepper Sam" and "Ukulele Sam."

References

External links
 Uke Museum Biography and .mp3 files.
 Dismuke's Two more songs.

Ukulele players
Scat singers